Sham bin Mat Sahat is a Malaysian politician. He was the Member of Perak State Legislative Assembly for Alor Pongsu from 2004 to 2022.

Politics 
He is the Chairman of UMNO Bagan Serai branch and was the political secretary for the Menteri Besar of Perak.

Election result

Honours 
  :
  Medal of the Order of the Defender of the Realm (PPN) (2003) 
  Member of the Order of the Defender of the Realm (AMN) (2007)
  :
  Knight Commander of the Order of the Perak State Crown (DPMP) – Dato’ (2011)

References 

United Malays National Organisation politicians
Members of the Perak State Legislative Assembly
Malaysian people of Malay descent
Living people
Year of birth missing (living people)
Medallists of the Order of the Defender of the Realm
Members of the Order of the Defender of the Realm